Mary Wiltenburg (born July 6, 1976) is an American journalist based in Baltimore, Maryland, whose stories profile unfamous people and communities.

Biography
Wiltenburg was born July 6, 1976 in Rochester, New York. She is the daughter of Candace O'Connor and the niece of Kyrie O'Connor. She is a 1998 graduate of Swarthmore College with a degree in English.

Wiltenburg's freelance reporting and photography have appeared in the Monitor, Der Spiegel, The Boston Globe Magazine, and Grist Magazine, and her multimedia and broadcast work on Nightline, This American Life, and Morning Edition. She started her journalism career at Seattle NPR affiliate KUOW and This American Life, before joining the staff of The Christian Science Monitor from 2001–2004, where she covered prison education, clergy sexual abuse, the aftermath of genocide in Rwanda, and the dawn of marriage equality in Massachusetts.

Awards
 2010 International Catholic Union of the Press Award for solidarity with refugees, for her series "Little Bill Clinton"
 2010 American Society of Journalists and Authors feature writing award, for her profile of a refugee stranded in Tanzania
 2008 National Education Writers Association multimedia award, for the "Little Bill Clinton" series 
 2008 German Marshall Fund Peter R. Weitz Award, for her coverage of US service members stationed in Germany 
 2001 National Education Writers Association feature writing award, for her story "Shakespeare Behind Bars"

References

External links
Mary Wiltenburg's website

1976 births
The Christian Science Monitor people
American women journalists
American reporters and correspondents
American non-fiction writers
Swarthmore College alumni
Living people